The International Academy of Macomb (IAM/IA) is a public, magnet high school in Macomb County, Michigan located in the Chippewa Valley 9th Grade Center in Clinton Township. The school opened in the spring of 2008 and is an International Baccalaureate school as of early 2010. The first two years at the IAM consist of International Baccalaureate Middle Years Programme courses . After these two years, students will begin the International Baccalaureate program, which lasts for two years. All IB students will have to complete 9 'CAS' experiences (creativity, action, service) throughout the two IB years. After all four years are completed, students will partake in several IB exams in order to receive their IB diploma. The students at the IAM get an understanding of the world through many great books, including Things Fall Apart by Chinua Achebe, The Odyssey by Homer, and The Great Gatsby by F. Scott Fitzgerald. Although it is an IB school, the IAM is still considered a public school, but it requires students to pass a test and get drawn in a lottery to become enrolled. There is no tuition required for students, but there is an initial $150 fee that will cover computer fees. Each student will receive his or her own laptop that will be used throughout the four years at the IAM, and any damage can usually be fixed with a re-imaging, including physical damage to the laptop.

Extracurricular activities

All of the IAM's Division I MHSAA sports teams are known as the Lady Leopards. The only sport that the IAM offers currently, as of 2020, is girls Powderpuff (sports) football. In October 2013, IAM secured their first victory in the annual "Nerd Bowl" by defeating the Utica Academy for International Studies by a score of 54-6.  On October 11, 2014, headed by brilliant coaches Greg Iacobelli, Ben Dib, Salvatore "Sal" Maltese, Sam Ebbit, and Miroslaw "Miko" Ochocinski, the Lady Leopards went on to defeat UAIS by a score of 55-18 and hereby setting the series record at 2-2. The Lady Leopards' slogan is "RKO Utica", in reference to famous wrestler Randy Orton.

On September 12, 2015, the IAM played UAIS for the first time at their home field. With only three weeks of practice, head coach Ben Dib and assistant coaches Alex Damer and Devin Bingham led the Leopards to a 32-12 victory over the Phoenix. This win marked the 3rd win for the IAM, putting them at a 3-2 series lead over UAIS.

In conjoined efforts with the powderpuff football team, the IAM also features an all-male cheerleading team, known for their energetic and elaborate performances featured at halftime.

In addition to powderpuff football, the IAM held its first annual softball tournament on May 31, 2014. This event, again, was against UAIS, with two teams from each school. IAM Team A (coached by Brandon Rickert, Chance Stevenson, and Kayla Strunk) and IAM Team B (coached by Jordan Edwards, Greg Iacobelli, and Maria Miglio) were both undefeated in the tournament, with the help of a 2-run, walk-off home run by Brandon Rickert while trailing by 1 in extra innings of Game 1. Both teams played each other in a championship game on a later day, with Team A winning by a score of 12-11. The idea for the tournament came from UAIS Junior Jessica DiGiovanni. After requesting assistance from an IAM Junior, Eoin Barry stepped up to the plate to help. The second annual IAM softball tournament took place on June 6, 2015, under the leadership of Eoin and Jessica's successor Brenna Wyffels. IAM won both charity softball tournaments. The 3rd annual tournament took place on June 4, 2016. 

The IAM also features various clubs. These include Soccer Club, Creative Writing Club, Red Cross Club, Excel Club, Book Club, Drama Club, Economy Club, Ecology Club, German Club, Dungeons and Dragons Club, Dodgeball Club, Video Game Club, Harry Potter Alliance, Art Club, Improv Club, Ski Club, Science Olympiad, Students Against Destructive Decisions, Basketball Club, Writing Club, Chess Club, Euchre Club, Anime Club, Quiz Bowl, Blender Club, Key Club, French Club, Diversity Club, Gay-Straight Alliance, Global Peace Club, Tea Club, and Spanish Club. And, to make it even better, students are allowed to make their own clubs if they can't find one that is personalized to them.

The IAM's FIRST Robotics Competition Team, Team 4810 I AM Robot, was founded in 2012, and won the Michigan Rookie All-Star Award in 2013, and the Troy District Entrepreneurship award in 2014. In 2018, they won the Creativity in Design Award at their Troy Competition and had the opportunity to compete in the Tesla Division of the FIRST Championship in Detroit. Recently, in 2019, I.AM.ROBOT Team 4810 hosted a Charity Dodgeball Tournament to benefit the charity, A Beautiful Me. They also won the Entrepreneurship Award and the Gracious Professionalism Awards at their district competitions.

The School also is a part of SEMMUNA, MUNNIAC, OUMUNIAC and has a large Model United Nations team. Not only this, but it participates in Tri-M Musical Honor Society, National Honor Society, National Spanish Honors Society, National French Honors Society, National Science Honors Society, Delta Epsilon Phi (German National Honors Society), and National Art Honor Society.

Awards and honors

The International Academy of Macomb, or the IAM, frequently places as one of the best High Schools in the United States and routinely is named in the top three schools in Michigan. As of 2019, it was ranked by U.S. News as the #1 High school in the State of Michigan, the #1 Magnet school in the nation, and the #8 High school in the nation.

See also
 International Academy

References

External links
 Official web site
 Consultant Services

Educational institutions established in 2008
Public high schools in Michigan
International Baccalaureate schools in Michigan
Schools in Macomb County, Michigan
2008 establishments in Michigan